Dereli is a village in the District of Antalya, Antalya Province, Turkey.

References

Villages in Antalya District